This is a list of lists of universities and colleges.

Subject of study
 Aerospace engineering
 Agriculture
 Art schools
 Business
 Chiropractic
 Engineering
 Forestry
 Law
 Maritime studies
 Medicine
 Music
 Nanotechnology
 Osteopathy
 Pharmaceuticals
 Social Work

Institution type

 Community colleges
 For-profit universities and colleges
 Land-grant universities
 Liberal arts universities
 National universities
 Postgraduate-only institutions
 Private universities
 Public universities
 Research universities
 Technical universities
 Sea-grant universities
 Space-grant universities
 State universities and colleges
 Unaccredited universities

Location
 Lists of universities and colleges by country
 List of largest universities

Religious affiliation

 Assemblies of God
 Baptist colleges and universities in the United States
 Catholic universities
 Ecclesiastical universities
 Benedictine colleges and universities
 Jesuit institutions
 Opus Dei universities
 Pontifical universities
 International Council of Universities of Saint Thomas Aquinas
 International Federation of Catholic Universities
 Christian churches and churches of Christ
 Churches of Christ
 Church of the Nazarene
 Islamic seminaries
 Lutheran colleges and universities
 International Association of Methodist-related Schools, Colleges, and Universities
 Muslim educational institutions
 Association of Presbyterian Colleges and Universities

Extremities
 Endowment
 Largest universities by enrollment
 Oldest madrasahs in continuous operation
 Oldest universities in continuous operation

Other
 Colleges and universities named after people

History
 Medieval universities
 Ancient universities in Britain and Ireland

See also

 
 
 
 
 Lists of schools
 Distance education

 

sq:Lista e universiteteve
zh:世界各国大学列表